The 1980 Central Michigan Chippewas football team represented Central Michigan University in the Mid-American Conference (MAC) during the 1980 NCAA Division I-A football season. In their third season under head coach Herb Deromedi, the Chippewas compiled a 9–2 record (7–2 against MAC opponents), won the MAC championship, and outscored their opponents, 218 to 127. The team played its home games in Perry Shorts Stadium in Mount Pleasant, Michigan, with attendance of 124,533 in six home games.

The team's statistical leaders included quarterback Kevin Northup with 1,011 passing yards, Willie Todd with 659 rushing yards, and tight end Mike Hirn with 388 receiving yards. Defensive tackle Chuck Stiver received the team's most valuable player award. Five Central Michigan players (Stiver, offensive tackle Marty Smallbone, offensive guard Joe Maiorana, defensive end Kurt Dobronski, and defensive back Robert Jackson) received first-team All-MAC honors.  Coach Deromedi received the MAC Coach of the Year award.

Schedule

Roster

See also
 1980 in Michigan

References

Central Michigan
Central Michigan Chippewas football seasons
Mid-American Conference football champion seasons
Central Michigan Chippewas football